

Events

Pre-1600
44 BC – Pharaoh Cleopatra VII of Egypt declares her son co-ruler as Ptolemy XV Caesarion.
  44 BC   – Cicero launches the first of his Philippicae (oratorical attacks) on Mark Antony. He will make 14 of them over the following months.
31 BC – Final War of the Roman Republic: Battle of Actium: Off the western coast of Greece, forces of Octavian defeat troops under Mark Antony and Cleopatra.
1192 – The Treaty of Jaffa is signed between Richard I of England and Saladin, leading to the end of the Third Crusade.
1561 – Entry of Mary, Queen of Scots into Edinburgh, a spectacular civic celebration for the Queen of Scotland, marred by religious controversy.

1601–1900
1649 – The Italian city of Castro is completely destroyed by the forces of Pope Innocent X, ending the Wars of Castro.
1666 – The Great Fire of London breaks out and burns for three days, destroying 10,000 buildings, including Old St Paul's Cathedral.
1752 – Great Britain, along with its overseas possessions, adopts the Gregorian calendar.
1789 – The United States Department of the Treasury is founded.
1792 – During what became known as the September Massacres of the French Revolution, rampaging mobs slaughter three Roman Catholic bishops, more than two hundred priests, and prisoners believed to be royalist sympathizers.
1806 – A massive landslide destroys the town of Goldau, Switzerland, killing 457.
1807 – Napoleonic Wars: The British Royal Navy bombards Copenhagen with fire bombs and phosphorus rockets to prevent Denmark from surrendering its fleet to Napoleon.
1856 – The Tianjing incident takes place in Nanjing, China.
1859 – The Carrington Event is the strongest geomagnetic storm on record.
1862 – American Civil War: United States President Abraham Lincoln reluctantly restores Union General George B. McClellan to full command after General John Pope's disastrous defeat at the Second Battle of Bull Run.
1864 – American Civil War: Union forces enter Atlanta, a day after the Confederate defenders flee the city, ending the Atlanta Campaign.
1867 – Mutsuhito, Emperor Meiji of Japan, marries Masako Ichijō, thereafter known as Empress Shōken. 
1870 – Franco-Prussian War: Battle of Sedan: Prussian forces take Napoleon III of France and 100,000 of his soldiers prisoner.
1885 – Rock Springs massacre: In Rock Springs, Wyoming, 150 white miners, who are struggling to unionize so they could strike for better wages and work conditions, attack their Chinese fellow workers killing 28, wounding 15 and forcing several hundred more out of town.
1898 – Battle of Omdurman: British and Egyptian troops defeat Sudanese tribesmen and establish British dominance in Sudan.

1901–present
1901 – Vice President of the United States Theodore Roosevelt utters the famous phrase, "Speak softly and carry a big stick" at the Minnesota State Fair.
1912 – Arthur Rose Eldred is awarded the first Eagle Scout award of the Boy Scouts of America.
1935 – The Labor Day Hurricane, the most intense hurricane to strike the United States, makes landfall at Long Key, Florida, killing at least 400.
1939 – World War II: Following the start of the invasion of Poland the previous day, the Free City of Danzig (now Gdańsk, Poland) is annexed by Nazi Germany.
1944 – The last execution of a Finn in Finland takes place when soldier Olavi Laiho is executed by shooting in Oulu.
1945 – World War II: The Japanese Instrument of Surrender is signed by Japan and the major warring powers aboard the battleship  in Tokyo Bay.
  1945   – Communist leader Ho Chi Minh proclaimed the Democratic Republic of Vietnam after the end of the Nguyễn dynasty.
1946 – The Interim Government of India is formed, headed by Jawaharlal Nehru as vice president with the powers of a Prime Minister.
1957 – President Ngô Đình Diệm of South Vietnam becomes the first foreign head of state to make a state visit to Australia.
1958 – A USAF RC-130 is shot down by fighters over Armenia when it strays into Soviet airspace while conducting a sigint mission. All crew members are killed.
1960 – The first election of the Tibetan Parliament-in-Exile. The Tibetan community observes this date as Democracy Day.
1963 – CBS Evening News becomes U.S. network television's first half-hour weeknight news broadcast, when the show is lengthened from 15 to 30 minutes.
1968 – Operation OAU begins during the Nigerian Civil War.
1970 – NASA announces the cancellation of two Apollo missions to the Moon, Apollo 15 (the designation is re-used by a later mission), and Apollo 19.
1984 – Seven people are shot and killed and 12 wounded in the Milperra massacre, a shootout between the rival motorcycle gangs Bandidos and Comancheros in Sydney, Australia.
1985 – Sri Lankan Civil War: Sri Lankan Tamil politicians and former MPs M. Alalasundaram and V. Dharmalingam are shot dead.
1987 – In Moscow, the trial begins for 19-year-old pilot Mathias Rust, who flew his Cessna airplane into Red Square in May.
1990 – Transnistria is unilaterally proclaimed a Soviet republic; the Soviet president Mikhail Gorbachev declares the decision null and void.
1992 – The 7.7  Nicaragua earthquake affected the west coast of Nicaragua. With a – disparity of half a unit, this tsunami earthquake triggered a tsunami that caused most of the damage and casualties, with at least 116 killed.
1998 – Swissair Flight 111 crashes near Peggy's Cove, Nova Scotia; all 229 people on board are killed.
  1998   – The UN's International Criminal Tribunal for Rwanda finds Jean-Paul Akayesu, the former mayor of a small town in Rwanda, guilty of nine counts of genocide.
2008 – Google launches its Google Chrome web browser. 
2009 – The Andhra Pradesh, India helicopter crash occurred near Rudrakonda Hill, 40 nautical miles (74 km) from Kurnool, Andhra Pradesh, India. Fatalities included Y. S. Rajasekhara Reddy, the Chief Minister of the Indian state of Andhra Pradesh.
2010 – Israel-Palestinian conflict: the 2010 Israeli-Palestinian peace talks are launched by the United States.
2013 – The Eastern span replacement of the San Francisco–Oakland Bay Bridge opens at 10:15 PM at a cost of $6.4 billion, after the 1989 Loma Prieta earthquake damaged the old span.
2019 – Hurricane Dorian, a category 5 hurricane, devastates the Bahamas, killing at least five.

Births

Pre-1600
1243 – Gilbert de Clare, 7th Earl of Gloucester, 6th Earl of Hertford, English politician (d. 1295)
1251 – Francis of Fabriano, Italian writer (d. 1322)
1516 – Francis I, Duke of Nevers (d. 1561)
1531 – Francesco Cattani da Diacceto, Bishop of Fiesole (d. 1595)
1548 – Vincenzo Scamozzi, Italian architect (d. 1616)

1601–1900
1661 – Georg Böhm, German organist and composer (d. 1733)
1675 – William Somervile, English poet and author (d. 1742)
1753 – Marie Joséphine of Savoy (d. 1810)
1778 – Louis Bonaparte, French-Dutch king (d. 1846)
1805 – Esteban Echeverría, Argentinian poet and author (d. 1851)
1810 – Lysander Button, American engineer (d. 1898)
  1810   – William Seymour Tyler, American historian and educator (d. 1897)
1814 – Ernst Curtius, German archaeologist and historian (d. 1896) 
1820 – Lucretia Peabody Hale, American journalist and author (d. 1900)
1830 – William P. Frye, American lawyer and politician (d. 1911)
1838 – Bhaktivinoda Thakur, Indian guru and philosopher (d. 1914)
  1838   – Liliʻuokalani of Hawaii (d. 1917)
1839 – Henry George, American economist and author (d. 1897)
1850 – Eugene Field, American author and poet (d. 1895)
  1850   – Albert Spalding, American baseball player, manager, and businessman, co-founded the Spalding Sporting Goods Company (d. 1915)
  1850   – Woldemar Voigt, German physicist and academic (d. 1919)
1852 – Paul Bourget, French author and critic (d. 1935)
1853 – Wilhelm Ostwald, Latvian-German chemist and academic, Nobel Prize laureate (d. 1932)
1856 – John Bowser, English-Australian politician, 26th Premier of Victoria (d. 1936)
1865 – Simeón Ola, Filipino general and politician (d. 1952)
1866 – Charles Vintcent, South African cricketer and rugby player (d. 1943)
1873 – Lily Poulett-Harris, Australian cricketer and educator (d. 1897)
1877 – Frederick Soddy, English chemist and academic, Nobel Prize laureate (d. 1956)
1878 – Herman, Estonian-Finnish archbishop (d. 1961)
  1878   – Werner von Blomberg, German field marshal (d. 1946)
1883 – Archduchess Elisabeth Marie of Austria (d. 1963)
1884 – Frank Laubach, American missionary and mystic (d. 1970)
1892 – Dezső Kertész, Hungarian actor and film director (d. 1965)  
1894 – Joseph Roth, Austrian journalist and author (d. 1939)
1897 – Fazlollah Zahedi, Iranian general and statesman, 36th Prime Minister of Iran (d. 1963)

1901–present
1901 – Andreas Embirikos, Greek psychoanalyst and poet (d. 1975)
  1901   – Adolph Rupp, American basketball player and coach (d. 1977)
1904 – August Jakobson, Estonian author and politician (d. 1963)
1907 – Pertev Naili Boratav, Turkish author and educator (d. 1998)
1908 – Ruth Bancroft, American landscape and garden designer (d. 2017)
1910 – Paul Saagpakk, Estonian linguist, lexicographer, and academic (d. 1996)
  1910   – Donald Watson, English activist, founded the Vegan Society (d. 2005)
1911 – Romare Bearden, American painter and author (d. 1988)
  1911   – William F. Harrah, American businessman, founded Harrah's Entertainment (d. 1978)
  1911   – Lill Tschudi, Swiss artist (d. 2004)
1912 – Ernest Bromley, Australian cricketer (d. 1967)
1913 – Israel Gelfand, Russian-American mathematician and biologist (d. 2009)
  1913   – Bill Shankly, Scottish footballer and manager (d. 1981)
1915 – Benjamin Aaron, American lawyer and scholar (d. 2007)
1916 – Ömer Lütfi Akad, Turkish director and screenwriter (d. 2011)
1917 – Laurindo Almeida, Brazilian-American guitarist and composer (d. 1995)
  1917   – Cleveland Amory, American author and critic (d. 1997)
1918 – Allen Drury, American journalist and author (d. 1998)
1919 – Marge Champion, American actress, dancer, and choreographer (d. 2020)
  1919   – Lance Macklin, English racing driver and businessman (d. 2002)
1922 – Arthur Ashkin, American physicist and Nobel Prize laureate (d. 2020)
  1922   – Leigh Kamman, American radio host (d. 2014)
1923 – René Thom, French mathematician, biologist, and academic (d. 2002)
  1923   – Ramón Valdés, Mexican actor and comedian (d. 1988)
1924 – Daniel arap Moi, Kenyan educator and politician, 2nd President of Kenya (d. 2020)
1925 – Hugo Montenegro, American composer and conductor (d. 1981)
1927 – Milo Hamilton, American sportscaster (d. 2015)
  1927   – Francis Matthews, English actor (d. 2014)
1928 – Jim Jordan, Canadian educator and politician (d. 2012)
  1928   – Horace Silver, American pianist and composer (d. 2014)
  1928   – Mel Stuart, American director and producer (d. 2012)
1929 – Hal Ashby, American actor, director, and producer (d. 1988)
  1929   – Beulah Bewley, English physician and academic (d. 2018)
  1929   – Rex Hartwig, Australian tennis player
  1929   – Victor Spinetti, Welsh actor and director (d. 2012)
1931 – Clifford Jordan, American saxophonist (d. 1993)
  1931   – Alan K. Simpson, American politician, senator of Wyoming
1932 – Walter Davis, Jr., American pianist (d. 1990)
  1932   – Arnold Greenberg, American businessman, co-founded Snapple (d. 2012)
1933 – Ed Conlin, American basketball player and coach (d. 2012)
  1933   – Mathieu Kérékou, Beninese soldier and politician, President of Benin (d. 2015)
1934 – Hilla Becher, German conceptual photographer (d. 2015)
  1934   – Sam Gooden, American soul singer (d. 2022)
  1934   – Chuck McCann, American actor and screenwriter (d. 2018)
  1934   – Grady Nutt, American comedian, minister, and author (d. 1982)
1935 – D. Wayne Lukas, American horse trainer
1936 – Andrew Grove, Hungarian-American businessman, engineer, and author (d. 2016)
  1936   – Károly Krajczár, Hungarian-Slovene author and educator (d. 2018)
1937 – Len Carlson, Canadian voice actor (d. 2006)
  1937   – Peter Ueberroth, American businessman
1938 – Leonard Appleyard, English diplomat, British Ambassador to China (d. 2020)
  1938   – Jimmy Clanton, American pop singer-songwriter
  1938   – Ernie Sigley, Australian television host (d. 2021)
1941 – Jyrki Otila, Finnish economist and politician (d. 2003)
  1941   – Sadhana Shivdasani, Indian actress (d. 2015)
  1941   – John Thompson, American basketball player, coach, and sportscaster (d. 2020)
1943 – Rosalind Ashford, American singer 
  1943   – Glen Sather, Canadian ice hockey player and manager
  1943   – Joe Simon, American singer-songwriter and producer (d. 2021)
1944 – Janet Simpson, English sprinter (d. 2010)
1946 – Luis Ávalos, Cuban-American actor (d. 2014)
  1946   – Mary Goudie, Baroness Goudie, English  humanitarian and politician
  1946   – Marty Grebb, American keyboardist, guitarist, saxophonist, and music producer/arranger (d. 2020)
  1946   – Billy Preston, American singer-songwriter, pianist, and actor (d. 2006)
  1946   – Walt Simonson, American author and illustrator
  1946   – Dan White, American assassin and politician (d. 1985)
1947 – Louis Michel, Belgian educator and politician, Belgian Minister of Foreign Affairs
  1947   – Jim Richards, New Zealand racing driver
1948 – Nate Archibald, American basketball player and coach
  1948   – Terry Bradshaw, American football player, sportscaster, and actor
  1948   – Christa McAuliffe, American educator and astronaut (d. 1986)
1949 – Moira Stuart, British broadcaster
  1949   – Hans-Hermann Hoppe, American economist and philosopher
1950 – Rosanna DeSoto, American actress 
  1950   – Michael Rother, German guitarist, keyboard player, and songwriter 
1951 – Jim DeMint, American politician
  1951   – Mark Harmon, American actor and producer
  1951   – Mik Kaminski, English musician, rock violinist
1952 – Jimmy Connors, American tennis player, coach, and sportscaster
  1952   – Mihhail Lotman, Estonian linguist, scholar, and politician
1953 – Maurice Colclough, English rugby player (d. 2006)
  1953   – Ahmad Shah Massoud, Afghan commander and politician, Afghan Minister of Defense (d. 2001)
  1953   – John Zorn, American saxophonist, composer, and producer
1954 – Billi Gordon, American neuroscientist, author, and actor. (d. 2018)
  1954   – Gai Waterhouse, Scottish-Australian horse trainer and businesswoman
1956 – Mario Tremblay, Canadian ice hockey player and coach
1957 – Tony Alva, American skateboarder and bass player
  1957   – Steve Porcaro, American keyboard player and songwriter 
1958 – Lynne Kosky, Australian social worker and politician (d. 2014)
1959 – Drungo Hazewood, American baseball player (d. 2013)
  1959   – Guy Laliberté, Canadian businessman, philanthropist, and poker player, founded Cirque du Soleil
1960 – Eric Dickerson, American football player and sportscaster
  1960   – Kristin Halvorsen, Norwegian politician, Norwegian Minister of Finance
  1960   – Rex Hudler, American baseball player and sportscaster
1961 – Carlos Valderrama, Colombian footballer and manager
  1961   – Ron Wasserman, American singer-songwriter and producer 
  1961   – Eugenio Derbez, Mexican actor, director, producer, and screenwriter
1962 – Alonso Lujambio, Mexican academic and politician (d. 2012)
  1962   – Prachya Pinkaew, Thai director, producer, and screenwriter
  1962   – Keir Starmer, English lawyer and politician, Leader of the Labour Party
  1962   – Tracy Smothers, American wrestler (d. 2020)
1963 – Sam Mitchell, American basketball player and coach
1964 – Andrea Illy, Italian businessman
  1964   – Keanu Reeves, Canadian actor, singer, and producer 
1965 – Lennox Lewis, English-Canadian boxer 
  1965   – Partho Sen-Gupta, Indian director and screenwriter
1966 – Dino Cazares, American guitarist, songwriter, and producer 
  1966   – Massimo Cuttitta, Italian rugby player and coach
  1966   – Salma Hayek, Mexican-American actress, director, and producer
  1966   – Olivier Panis, French racing driver
  1966   – Tuc Watkins, American actor
1967 – Frank Fontsere, American drummer and songwriter 
  1967   – Andreas Möller, German footballer and manager
1968 – Cynthia Watros, American actress
1969 – K-Ci, American R&B singer-songwriter 
  1969   – Stéphane Matteau, Canadian ice hockey player
1971 – Kjetil André Aamodt, Norwegian skier
  1971   – Pawan Kalyan, Indian actor politician
  1971   – Tommy Maddox, American football player and coach
  1971   – César Sánchez, Spanish footballer
  1971   – Tom Steels, Belgian cyclist
  1971   – Katt Williams, American comedian and actor
1972 – Robert Coles, English golfer
1973 – Matthew Dunn, Australian swimmer
  1973   – Jason Blake, American ice hockey player
  1973   – Indika de Saram, Sri Lankan cricketer
  1973   – Sudeep, Indian actor, filmmaker and television presenter
1975 – Jill Janus, American singer (d. 2018)
  1975   – MC Chris, American rapper, actor, and screenwriter
1976 – Syleena Johnson, American R&B and soul singer-songwriter and actress
  1976   – Aziz Zakari, Ghanaian sprinter
1977 – Frédéric Kanouté, Malian footballer
1979 – Tomer Ben Yosef, Israeli footballer
  1979   – Brian Westbrook, American football player
1980 – Dany Sabourin, Canadian ice hockey player
  1980   – Danny Shittu, Nigerian footballer
  1980   – Hiroki Yoshimoto, Japanese race car driver
1981 – Fariborz Kamkari, Iranian director, producer, and screenwriter
  1981   – Jennifer Hopkins, American tennis player
  1981   – Chris Tremlett, English cricketer
1982 – Joey Barton, English footballer
  1982   – Jason Hammel, American baseball player
  1982   – Mark Phillips, English footballer
1983 – Rich Boy, American rapper and producer
  1983   – Mark Foster, English rugby player
1984 – Jack Peñate, English singer-songwriter and guitarist
1985 – Keith Galloway, Australian rugby league player
1986 – Gélson Fernandes, Swiss footballer
  1986   – Kyle Hines, American basketball player
1987 – Scott Moir, Canadian ice dancer
1988 – Ibrahim Šehić, Bosnian footballer 
  1988   – Keisuke Kato, Japanese actor and singer
  1988   – Javi Martínez, Spanish footballer
  1988   – Ishant Sharma, Indian cricketer
  1988   – Ishmeet Singh, Indian singer (d. 2008)
1989 – Marcus Morris, American basketball player
  1989   – Zedd, Russian-German record producer, DJ, multi-instrumentalist and songwriter
  1989   – Markieff Morris, American basketball player
  1989   – Alexandre Pato, Brazilian footballer
1990 – Marcus Ericsson, Swedish race car driver
  1990   – Shayla Worley, American gymnast
1991 – Mareks Mejeris, Latvian basketball player
  1991   – Gyasi Zardes, American footballer
1992 – Xenia Knoll, Swiss tennis player
  1992   – Nenad Lukić, Serbian footballer
  1992   – Alberto Masi, Italian footballer
1993 – Tom Anderson, English footballer
  1993   – Zaza Nadiradze, Georgian sprint canoeist
  1993   – Robert Rooba, Estonian ice hockey player
1994 – Kishen Velani, English cricketer
1995 – İbrahim Demir, Turkish footballer
  1995   – Deimantas Petravičius, Lithuanian footballer
  1995   – Willy Adames, Dominican baseball player
  1998 – Choi Ye-bin, South Korean actress

Deaths

Pre-1600
 421 – Constantius III, Roman emperor
 459 – Simeon Stylites, Byzantine saint (b. 390)
 595 – John IV of Constantinople
1022 – Máel Sechnaill mac Domnaill, king of Mide and High King of Ireland
1031 – Saint Emeric of Hungary (b. 1000)
1083 – King Munjong of Goryeo (b. 1019)
1274 – Prince Munetaka, Japanese shōgun (b. 1242)
1397 – Francesco Landini, Italian composer
1540 – Dawit II of Ethiopia (b. 1501)

1601–1900
1606 – Karel van Mander, Dutch painter and poet (b. 1548)
1651 – Kosem Sultan, Ottoman Valide sultan and regent (b.1589)
1680 – Per Brahe the Younger, Swedish soldier and politician, Lord High Steward of Sweden (b. 1602)
1688 – Sir Robert Vyner, 1st Baronet, English businessman and politician, Lord Mayor of London (b. 1631)
1690 – Philip William, Elector Palatine, German Count Palatine of Neuburg  (b. 1615)
1764 – Nathaniel Bliss, English astronomer and mathematician (b. 1700)
1765 – Henry Bouquet, Swiss-English colonel (b. 1719)
1768 – Antoine Deparcieux, French mathematician and theorist (b. 1703)
1790 – Johann Nikolaus von Hontheim, German historian and theologian (b. 1701)
1813 – Jean Victor Marie Moreau, French general (b. 1763)
1820 – Jiaqing Emperor of China (b. 1760)
1832 – Franz Xaver von Zach, Hungarian-French astronomer and academic (b. 1754)
1834 – Thomas Telford, Scottish engineer and architect, designed the Menai Suspension Bridge (b. 1757)
1865 – William Rowan Hamilton, Irish physicist, astronomer, and mathematician (b. 1805)
1872 – N. F. S. Grundtvig, Danish pastor, philosopher, and author (b. 1783)
1877 – Konstantinos Kanaris, Greek admiral and politician, 16th Prime Minister of Greece (b. 1793)
1885 – Giuseppe Bonavia, Maltese architect (b. 1821)
1898 – Wilford Woodruff, American religious leader, 4th President of The Church of Jesus Christ of Latter-day Saints (b. 1807)

1901–present
1910 – Henri Rousseau, French painter (b. 1844)
1918 – John Forrest, Australian politician, 1st Premier of Western Australia (b. 1847)
1921 – Henry Austin Dobson, English poet and critic (b. 1840)
1922 – Henry Lawson, Australian poet and author (b. 1867)
1927 – Umegatani Tōtarō II, Japanese sumo wrestler, the 20th Yokozuna (b. 1878)
1934 – James Allan, New Zealand rugby player (b. 1860)
  1934   – Russ Columbo, American singer, violinist, and actor (b. 1908)
  1934   – Alcide Nunez, American clarinet player (Original Dixieland Jass Band) (b. 1884)
1937 – Pierre de Coubertin, French historian and educator, founded the International Olympic Committee (b. 1863)
1941 – Lloyd Seay, American race car driver (b. 1919)
1942 – James Juvenal, American rower (b. 1874)
1943 – Marsden Hartley, American painter and poet (b. 1877)
1944 – Bella Rosenfeld, Russian-American model and author (b. 1895)
1945 – Mason Phelps, American golfer (b. 1885)
1948 – Sylvanus Morley, American archaeologist and spy (b. 1883)
1953 – Hendrik Offerhaus, Dutch rower (b. 1875)
  1953   – Jonathan M. Wainwright, American general, Medal of Honor recipient (b. 1883)
1954 – Franz Leopold Neumann, German lawyer and political scientist (b. 1900)
1962 – William Wilkerson, American publisher and businessman (b. 1890)
1964 – Glenn Albert Black, American archaeologist and scholar (b. 1900)
  1964   – Alvin C. York, American colonel, Medal of Honor recipient (b. 1887)
1965 – Johannes Bobrowski, German poet and author (b. 1917)
1969 – Ho Chi Minh, Vietnamese politician, 1st President of Vietnam (b. 1890)
1971 – Robert Mensah, Ghanaian footballer (b. 1939)
1973 – Carl Dudley, American director, producer, and screenwriter (b. 1910)
  1973   – J. R. R. Tolkien, English novelist, short story writer, poet, and philologist  (b. 1892)
1975 – Mabel Vernon, American activist (b. 1883)
1976 – Stanisław Grochowiak, Polish poet and playwright (b. 1934)
1977 – Stephen Dunne, American actor (b. 1918)
1978 – Fred G. Meyer, American businessman, founded Fred Meyer (b. 1886)
1979 – Otto P. Weyland, American general (b. 1903)
1983 – Feri Cansel, Turkish-Cypriot actress (b. 1944)
1984 – Manos Katrakis, Greek actor (b. 1908)
1985 – M. Alalasundaram, Sri Lankan Tamil teacher and politician
  1985   – Abe Lenstra, Dutch footballer (b. 1920)
  1985   – V. Dharmalingam, Sri Lankan Tamil politician (b. 1918)
  1985   – Jay Youngblood, American wrestler (b. 1955)
1987 – Brian Clay, Australian rugby league player (b. 1935)
1990 – Robert Holmes à Court, South African-Australian businessman and lawyer (b. 1937)
1991 – Alfonso García Robles, Mexican politician and diplomat, Nobel Prize laureate (b. 1911)
1992 – Barbara McClintock, American geneticist and botanist, Nobel Prize laureate (b. 1902)
1996 – Paddy Clift, Zimbabwean cricketer (b. 1953)
1997 – Rudolf Bing, Austrian-American manager (b. 1902)
  1997   – Viktor Frankl, Austrian neurologist and psychiatrist (b. 1905)
1998 – Jackie Blanchflower, Northern Irish footballer (b. 1933)
  1998   – Allen Drury, American journalist and author (b. 1918)
2000 – Elvera Sanchez, American dancer (b. 1905)
  2000   – Curt Siodmak, German-American author and screenwriter (b. 1907)
2001 – Christiaan Barnard, South African surgeon and academic (b. 1922)
  2001   – Troy Donahue, American actor (b. 1936)
2002 – Dick Reynolds, Australian footballer and coach (b. 1915)
2004 – Joan Oró, Catalan biochemist and academic (b. 1923)
2005 – Bob Denver, American actor (b. 1935)
2006 – Bob Mathias, American decathlete and politician (b. 1930)
  2006   – Willi Ninja, American dancer and choreographer (b. 1961)
  2006   – Dewey Redman, American saxophonist (b. 1931)
2007 – Franz-Benno Delonge, German game designer, created TransAmerica (b. 1957)
  2007   – Max McNab, Canadian ice hockey player and coach (b. 1924)
2008 – Bill Melendez, Mexican-American animator, director, producer, and voice actor (b. 1916)
  2008   – Alan Waddell, Australian walker
2009 – Y. S. Rajasekhara Reddy, Indian politician, 14th Chief Minister of Andhra Pradesh (b. 1949)
2011 – Roberto Bruce, Chilean journalist (b. 1979)
  2011   – Felipe Camiroaga, Chilean television presenter (b. 1966)
2012 – Mark Abrahamian, American guitarist (b. 1966)
  2012   – Jack Boucher, American photographer and director (b. 1931)
  2012   – John C. Marshall, English singer-songwriter and guitarist (b. 1941)
  2012   – Emmanuel Nunes, Portuguese-French composer and educator (b. 1941)
2013 – Valérie Benguigui, French actress and director (b. 1965)
  2013   – Terry Clawson, English rugby player and coach (b. 1940)
  2013   – Ronald Coase, English-American economist and author, Nobel Prize laureate (b. 1910)
  2013   – David Jacobs, English radio and television host (b. 1926)
  2013   – Frederik Pohl, American author and publisher (b. 1919)
  2013   – Paul Scoon, Grenadian politician, 2nd Governor-General of Grenada (b. 1935)
2014 – Peter Carter, Nigerian-English diplomat, British Ambassador to Estonia (b. 1956)
  2014   – F. Emmett Fitzpatrick, American lawyer and politician, 20th District Attorney of Philadelphia (b. 1930)
  2014   – Norman Gordon, South African cricketer (b. 1911)
  2014   – Helena Rakoczy, Polish gymnast (b. 1921)
  2014   – Goolam Essaji Vahanvati, Indian lawyer and politician, 13th Attorney General of India (b. 1949)
2015 – Ephraim Engleman, American rheumatologist, author, and academic (b. 1911)
2016 – Jerry Heller, American music manager (b. 1940)
  2016   – Islam Karimov, Uzbek politician, 1st President of Uzbekistan (b. 1938)
2018 – Claire Wineland, American activist and author (b. 1997)
2021 – Siddharth Shukla, Indian TV and film actor (b. 1980)
  2021   – Mikis Theodorakis, Greek composer (b. 1925)
2022 – Frank Drake, American radio astronomer and astrophysicist (b. 1930)
  2022   – T. V. Sankaranarayanan, Indian Carnatic vocalist (b. 1945)

Holidays and observances
 Christian feast day:
 Acepsimas of Hnaita and companions (Syriac Orthodox Church)
 Agricola of Avignon
 Antoninus of Pamiers
 Brocard
 Castor of Apt
 Diomedes
 Eleazar
 Hieu
 Ingrid of Sweden
 Justus of Lyon
 Margaret of Louvain
 Maxima of Rome
 Nonnosus
 William of Roskilde
 September 2 (Eastern Orthodox liturgics)
 Democracy Day (Tibet)
 Independence Day (Transnistria, unrecognized)
 Independence Day (Artsakh, unrecognized)
 National Blueberry Popsicle Day (United States)
 National Day, celebrates the independence of Vietnam from Japan and France in 1945
 Victory over Japan Day (United States)

References

External links

 
 
 

Days of the year
September